The Chilson Bridge, near Edgemont, South Dakota, is a bridge which brings a local road, formerly U.S. Highway 18, over BNSF railroad tracks.  It was built in 1929 and was listed on the National Register of Historic Places in 1993.  It has also been denoted as South Dakota Dept. of Transportation Bridge No. 24-162-102

It is a  pin-connected Pratt truss deck bridge.   It is located 4.0 miles east and 1.8 miles north of
Edgemont.

The bridge has been closed to vehicular traffic.

References

Bridges in South Dakota
National Register of Historic Places in South Dakota
Bridges completed in 1929
Fall River County, South Dakota
U.S. Route 18